David Jewell may refer to:
 David Jewell (headmaster)
 David Jewell (poet)